Hindsiclava pyrgoma is an extinct species of sea snail, a marine gastropod mollusc in the family Pseudomelatomidae, the turrids and allies.

Description
The length of the shell attains 35.5 mm, its diameter 10.5 mm.

Distribution
Fossils of this marine species have been found in Miocene strata in Panama; age range: 7.246 to 5.332 Ma

References

 W. P. Woodring. 1970. Geology and paleontology of canal zone and adjoining parts of Panama: Description of Tertiary mollusks (gastropods: Eulimidae, Marginellidae to Helminthoglyptidae). United States Geological Survey Professional Paper 306(D):299–452

External links
 Fossilworks: † Crassispira (Hindsiclava) pyrgoma

pyrgoma
Gastropods described in 1970